Wycombe Abbey International School of Changzhou (WAISCZ; 常州市武进区威雅实验学校, or 常州威雅 in short), formerly Oxford International College of Changzhou or Changzhou Wujin Oxford International College Experimental School (CZOIC; 牛津国际公学常州学校), is an international educational facility in Wujin District, Changzhou, China.

WAISCZ is managed by BE Education and is a British Boarding School, from Kindergarten through to year 13. WAISCZ prepares students to study abroad at universities primarily in the United Kingdom and United States by offering both IGCSE and A-Level study programmes. WAISCZ is open to both Chinese and foreign students aged 2–18. Both the primary and secondary schools are built on the foundations of the British International Curriculum. 

The school moved to its new campus in February 2015, a site which includes three teaching buildings, a purpose built Watersports Centre (swimming pool and boathouse), a theatre and drama building, separate KG building, indoor basketball and tennis courts and outdoor sports facilities comprising a full size athletics track and stadium with a grass sports field. 

The school's capacity is 1000 students, which is projected to be achieved by September 2018.

In September 2016 it was rebranded as Wycombe Abbey School and is now the first overseas affiliate of Wycombe Abbey School in the United Kingdom. It educates both boys and girls while the mother school in the UK only educates girls.  the school had students from at least 18 countries, with Chinese students making up about 80% of the student body.

References

British international schools in China
International schools in Jiangsu